Abbott High School is a public high school located in Abbott, Texas (USA) and classified as a 1A school by the UIL. It is part of the Abbott Independent School District located in southern Hill County.  In 2015, the school was rated "Met Standard" by the Texas Education Agency.

Athletics
The Abbott Panthers compete Cross Country, Volleyball, Six-man football, Basketball, Golf, Tennis, Track, and Baseball.

State Titles
Volleyball
1978(1A), 1979(1A)
Football
2015(1A-D1)

Notable alumni
Willie Nelson - country singer is a 1950 graduate of Abbott High School

References

External links
Abbott ISD
List of Six-man football stadiums in Texas

Public high schools in Texas
Schools in Hill County, Texas
Public middle schools in Texas
Public elementary schools in Texas